Lyes Oukkal (born 5 November 1991) is an Algerian footballer who plays for JSM Skikda in the Algerian Ligue Professionnelle 1.

References 

USM Alger players
1991 births
Living people
Algerian footballers
Association football central defenders
21st-century Algerian people